Arulmolipet or Arulmozhipettai is a village in the Alangudi Panchayat, Ammapettai Block, Papanasam taluk in Thanjavur district, Tamil Nadu, India.

Demographics
As per the 2001 census, Arulmolipet had a total population of 854 with 420 males and 434 females. The sex ratio was 1033. The literacy rate was 71.25.

References 

 

Villages in Thanjavur district